Breaking Bad is a neo-Western crime drama franchise created by American filmmaker Vince Gilligan, primarily based on the television series Breaking Bad (2008–2013) and Better Call Saul (2015–2022), and the film El Camino: A Breaking Bad Movie (2019). The fictional universe is sometimes informally referred to as the "Gilliverse".

Breaking Bad revolves around chemistry teacher turned-methamphetamine drug lord Walter White (Bryan Cranston) and his former student and fellow cook/dealer Jesse Pinkman (Aaron Paul). Better Call Saul follows criminal lawyer Jimmy McGill / Saul Goodman (Bob Odenkirk), whom Walter and Jesse eventually hire in Breaking Bad, and former police officer turned-criminal enforcer and cleaner Mike Ehrmantraut (Jonathan Banks), who becomes associated with all three over the course of both series. El Camino: A Breaking Bad Movie focuses on Jesse after the events of Breaking Bad. Gilligan believes Breaking Bad, Better Call Saul, and El Camino can be seen independently from one another, but exist in the same framework and need to be viewed together to receive the full experience.

The two television series and the film are set in Albuquerque, New Mexico, and give a modernized twist to Westerns set in the region. They were produced at Albuquerque Studios and emboldened success for the media in Albuquerque and film in New Mexico. The franchise is owned by Sony Pictures Television and has garnered numerous awards for Breaking Bad, for Better Call Saul, and for El Camino. The two series originally aired on AMC, while the film premiered on Netflix, on which both television series air internationally (outside of United States).

The franchise has since expanded across several different mediums and multimedia platforms, with contributions from its recurring cast and crew.

Television series

Breaking Bad (2008–2013)

Breaking Bad tells the story of Walter White (Bryan Cranston), an underpaid, overqualified, and dispirited high-school chemistry teacher in Albuquerque, New Mexico. After being diagnosed with stage-three lung cancer, he enlists the help of his former chemistry student, Jesse Pinkman, to produce and distribute crystal meth to secure his family's financial future. He tries to leave the drug-making business but continues to be drawn into the criminal underworld, and soon becomes a major drug kingpin under the name "Heisenberg" which he continues to hide from his family and friends.

Among the show's co-stars are Anna Gunn and RJ Mitte as Walter's wife Skyler and son Walter Jr., and Betsy Brandt and Dean Norris as Skyler's sister Marie Schrader and her husband Hank, a DEA agent. Others include Bob Odenkirk as Walter's and Jesse's lawyer Saul Goodman, Jonathan Banks as private investigator and fixer Mike Ehrmantraut, and Giancarlo Esposito as drug kingpin Gus Fring. The final season introduces Jesse Plemons as the criminally ambitious Todd Alquist, and Laura Fraser as Lydia Rodarte-Quayle, a cunning business executive secretly managing Walter's global meth sales for her company.

The show aired on AMC from January 20, 2008, to September 29, 2013, consisting of five seasons for a total of 62 episodes.

Better Call Saul (2015–2022)

Better Call Saul focuses on Saul Goodman's life, six years before he became Walter's lawyer, as Jimmy McGill, a more earnest lawyer trying to turn away from his troublesome con-man days. In addition to Odenkirk, Banks and Esposito star and reprise their roles as Mike and Gus, respectively, while several other Breaking Bad cast members have guest-starred on the show. Newcomers to the starring cast of Better Call Saul include Rhea Seehorn, Patrick Fabian, Michael Mando, Michael McKean, and Tony Dalton.

Bob Odenkirk's character of Saul Goodman was originally to appear in Breaking Bad in three episodes within the show's second season, but became a main character through the rest of the show's run in part due to the strength of Odenkirk's acting abilities. Goodman became one of the show's more popular characters, and Odenkirk, Gilligan, and Peter Gould, who wrote the episode "Better Call Saul" in which the character was introduced, started discussions near the end of Breaking Bad of a possible series expanding on the character, eventually settling on the idea of a prequel to show the origins of Saul about six years prior to the events of Breaking Bad. In April 2013, AMC and Sony Pictures Television expressed interest in Gilligan and Gould's spin-off series concept, and they officially ordered Better Call Saul in September 2013.

The show premiered on February 8, 2015, with a sixth and final season aired in 2022 to complete a 63-episode run. Better Call Saul has received similar critical praise as Breaking Bad, and is considered as a prime example of how to produce a spinoff work that defies the usual expectations of such forms.

Slippin' Jimmy (2022)

Variety reported in March 2021 that AMC was developing a spin-off animated series, Slippin' Jimmy. The series, a prequel based on younger Jimmy and Chuck's time in Cicero, Illinois, was developed by Ariel Levine and Kathleen Williams-Foshee, who previously worked on the associated live-action web series Better Call Saul Employee Training (2017–2022). Voice actors include Chi McBride, Laraine Newman, and Sean Giambrone as Jimmy.

Slippin' Jimmy was later revealed as a short-form series; a six-part animated series to be released online during the sixth season of Better Call Saul. Told in the style of classic 1970s-era cartoons, each episode is an ode to a specific movie genre — from Spaghetti Westerns and Buster Keaton to The Exorcist. The series was produced by Rick and Morty animators Starburns and written by Levine and Williams-Foshee. Six episodes, each around 8–9 minutes in length, were released on AMC+ on May 23, 2022.

Future
Near the end of Better Call Saul broadcast run in August 2022, Vince Gilligan said that he does not plan to create any more works in the Breaking Bad franchise, as he cannot expect any further installments to be critically successful. He said "I think I'm starting to sense you’ve got to know when to leave the party, you don't want to be the guy with a lampshade on your head." Peter Gould later acknowledged that by the premiere of Breaking Bads finale, he and Gilligan were already working on the spin-off, but when Better Call Sauls finale aired the two were working separately on new projects.

Despite this, Giancarlo Esposito, who portrays Gus Fring, stated that "Gustavo Fring isn’t done," expressing interest in a "show that would reflect Gustavo’s past [and] to play the vision in my mind that inspired and informed the Gus you see but don’t know. I would like you to know that Gus. It's intriguing to know where he came from," although admitting it would be up to Gilligan and his team and partners, with whom he had discussed the concept of such a series in the past. As of September 2022 Esposito has continued to express interest in the project, tentatively entitled "The Rise of Gus", describing it as a "yearning inside" him.

On February 14, 2023, it was reported by The Hankyoreh that Breaking Bad would be remade in South Korea. The production company JP E&M will be producing the series which will be aired on an OTT streaming platform for four seasons. The first season is planned to be aired in early 2024 and it will be directed Lee Chang-yeol.

Film

El Camino: A Breaking Bad Movie (2019)

While writing Breaking Bads series finale "Felina", Vince Gilligan asked himself what happened to Jesse Pinkman after the events of the series. Near the tenth anniversary of Breaking Bads premiere, Gilligan started sharing the idea of creating a sequel film based on this concept. Aaron Paul, who portrayed Jesse on the series and who still felt attachment to the character, expressed eagerness to be involved with any idea for a Breaking Bad continuation. When Gilligan made his initial film pitch to Sony Pictures Television, the executives in the room quickly agreed to come on board. After completing the script, Gilligan selectively shopped the film to a few potential distributors, settling on Netflix and AMC due to their history with the show.

A sequel film was formally announced in February 2019, and was later revealed to be titled El Camino: A Breaking Bad Movie. Written and directed by Gilligan, and starring Paul, El Camino follows after the events of "Felina" as Jesse searches for his freedom. It was released exclusively on Netflix on October 11, 2019, and was broadcast on AMC on February 16, 2020. Critics praised Gilligan's direction and Paul's performance, but gave a mixed consensus regarding the film's necessity to Breaking Bads chronology.

Web series

Breaking Bad: Original Minisodes (2009–2011)

Breaking Bad: Original Minisodes is a web series based on the television series Breaking Bad. A total of 17 "minisodes", which are more comedy-oriented than most full episodes, were released over the course of three years.

Better Call Saul Employee Training (2017–2022)
From 2017 to 2022, AMC released four separate short series that feature a mix of live action and animated segments in conjunction with the last four seasons of Better Call Saul. Season three featured Los Pollos Hermanos Employee Training with Esposito portraying Gus, season four featured Madrigal Electromotive Security Training with Mike Ehrmantraut with Banks as Mike, season five featured Ethics Training with Kim Wexler with Seehorn as Kim and side-voiceovers from Odenkirk as Jimmy and Patrick Fabian as Howard, and season six featured Filmmaker Training with the film crew that helped Jimmy make his advertisements. These were released over the course of each season on YouTube and through AMC's social media. The first three series consisted of ten episodes, while the last consisted of six.

Both Los Pollos Hermanos Employee Training and Ethics Training with Kim Wexler received the Primetime Emmy Award for Outstanding Short Form Comedy or Drama Series, and while Madrigal Electromotive Security Training with Mike Ehrmantraut had been initially nominated, the Academy had to pull the nomination after discovering the show was too short (less than two minutes), though stated the pull was "in no way a diminishment of the quality of Better Call Saul Employee Training or Mr. Banks's performance in it".

The Broken and the Bad (2020)
In June 2020, AMC announced The Broken and the Bad, a six-part true crime short-form docuseries inspired by Breaking Bad and Better Call Saul. The miniseries explored real-world stories and situations that mirrored the fictional worlds of both shows. Episode subjects included the psychology of con artists and hit men, the economics of massive drug operations, as well as a town in the United States that catered to those who suffered from electromagnetic hypersensitivity, a condition that Better Call Saul character Chuck McGill believed afflicted him. The miniseries was hosted by Giancarlo Esposito and premiered on the AMC app and AMC.com on July 9, 2020.

Short films

Chicks 'N' Guns (2013)
In 2013, an eight-minute bonus scene titled Chicks 'N' Guns was included with Breaking Bads fifth season DVD and Blu-ray sets. Written by Jenn Carroll and Gordon Smith and directed by Michelle MacLaren, the scene offers a backstory on how Jesse Pinkman obtained the gun seen in the episode "Gliding Over All". Sony Pictures released a behind-the-scenes featurette discussing the scene on its YouTube channel.

No Picnic (2017)

On June 19, 2017, the night of Better Call Sauls third season finale, fans were able to access the three-minute short film No Picnic, which feature the characters Betsy and Craig Kettleman, who had not been seen since the first season. The short, directed by Saul associate producer Jenn Carroll and written by the show's writers' assistant Ariel Levine, shows the Kettleman family organizing a picnic close to family patriarch Craig, who is seen picking up roadside litter with his fellow inmates as part of his prison sentence.

Snow Globe: A Breaking Bad Short (2020)

In conjunction with the television premiere of El Camino: A Breaking Bad Movie on AMC, the network released a three-minute short film Snow Globe: A Breaking Bad Short on its official YouTube account on February 17, 2020.

American Greed: James McGill (2022)

In April 2022, a few weeks before Better Call Sauls  sixth season premiere, the CNBC Prime YouTube account uploaded American Greed: James McGill. Written by Peter Gould's assistant Valerie Chu, the ten-minute short was a mockumentary done in the style of the documentary series American Greed. It featured interviews of several recurring Better Call Saul characters recounting their memories of Jimmy McGill and Kim Wexler.

Breaking Good (2023)
On February 12, 2023, a commercial for PopCorners chips aired during Super Bowl LVII. Titled Breaking Good, the short was directed by Vince Gilligan and featured Bryan Cranston, Aaron Paul, and Raymond Cruz reprising their roles as Walter White, Jesse Pinkman, and Tuco Salamanca, respectively.

Recurring cast and characters

Notes

Other media 
Prior to the start of production of the fifth season, Jeffrey Katzenberg had approached the series' creators and offered them to produce three additional episodes at  a piece compared to the normal  cost of each episode, as to create material for his future streaming platform, Quibi. The episodes would have been broken up into 5 to 10 minute chapters as to fit Quibi's micro-format. The Breaking Bad team turned down this offer, chiefly as there was not much material they could continue into these episodes.

Metástasis (2014) 

On March 13, 2013, after several days of speculation fueled by Univision, Sony confirmed that it would be making a Spanish-language remake of Breaking Bad titled Metástasis starring Diego Trujillo as Walter Blanco (Walter White) and Roberto Urbina as José Miguel Rosas (Jesse Pinkman), alongside Sandra Reyes and Julián Arango in unnamed roles. On October 2, 2013, the cast list was revealed to include Reyes as Cielo Blanco (Skyler White) and Arango as Henry Navarro (Hank Schrader), and that the show would be set in Colombia. The equivalent of Saul Goodman is named Saúl Bueno.

The series ran from June 8, 2014, to September 18, 2014, airing a total of 62 episodes.

Podcasts and talk shows

Breaking Bad Insider Podcast
The Breaking Bad Insider Podcast is a pre-recorded series where series creator Vince Gilligan and editor Kelley Dixon host a weekly conversation with the cast and crew of Breaking Bad to discuss the newest episode. The podcast began during the first episode of the second season.

Talking Bad

From August 11, 2013, to September 29, 2013, eight episodes of the live talk show, Talking Bad, aired on AMC, following Breaking Bad. The host, Chris Hardwick, and guests—who included celebrity fans, cast members, and Breaking Bad crew members—discussed episodes that aired immediately preceding the talk show. Talking Bad was inspired by the success of Talking Dead (also hosted by Hardwick), which airs immediately following new episodes of The Walking Dead, and the talk shows share a similar logo and theme music.

Better Call Saul Insider Podcast
The Better Call Saul Insider Podcast is a pre-recorded series which the creators gather to discuss the episode recently broadcast. Originally started as part of the Breaking Bad series, the podcast discusses the production of the show and features actors discussing their decisions and process of the characters they play. The crew also details their methods in deciding how an episode was shot. The show routinely includes the major cast, director and camera crew of the respective episodes.

Talking Saul

From February 15, 2016, to August 8, 2022, six episodes of the live talk show, Talking Saul, aired on AMC, following Better Call Saul. The host, Chris Hardwick, and guests—who included celebrity fans, cast members, and Better Call Saul crew members—discussed episodes that aired immediately preceding the talk show. Talking Saul was inspired by the success of Talking Dead and Talking Bad (both of which were also hosted by Hardwick).

Comics

Breaking Bad: All Bad Things
AMC released the digital comic book Breaking Bad: All Bad Things in August 2013. The comic "recaps the first four-and-a-half seasons of Walter White's descent from mild-mannered chemistry teacher to drug kingpin".

Better Call Saul: Client Development
In February 2015, in advance of the series premiere, AMC released its first digital comic book for Better Call Saul. Titled Better Call Saul: Client Development, it details the history of Saul Goodman and Mike Ehrmantraut alongside how they find out Mr. Mayhew is Walter White. This would later be retconned by the Better Call Saul episode "Breaking Bad".

Better Call Saul: Saul Goodman and the Justice Consortium in the Clutches of the Judgernaut!
In February 2016, in advance of the second-season premiere, AMC released Better Call Saul: Saul Goodman and the Justice Consortium in the Clutches of the Judgernaut!

Video games
Gilligan has stated interest in production of video games based on the Breaking Bad franchise, though he does not want the result to be a bad game such as the infamous E.T. the Extra-terrestrial. One idea he had was to have a game similar to the Grand Theft Auto series.

Breaking Bad: Criminal Elements

On June 6, 2019, FTX Games released Breaking Bad: Criminal Elements, a strategy-mobile video game for both iOS and Android. The game contains many elements of the original show and focuses mainly on the player building their own drug empire from nothing, similar to how Walt did in the show. The game closed in September 2020.

Fan works

Breaking Bad – Ozymandias (2013)
In October 2013, New York composer Sung Jin Hong announced his intentions to create an opera inspired by the Breaking Bad episode "Ozymandias". The mini-opera, titled Breaking Bad – Ozymandias, premiered on January 26, 2014. The opera incorporates themes from both the Percy Bysshe Shelley's sonnet "Ozymandias" as well as the episode that shares the same name.

Breaking Bad: The Movie (2017)
In 2017, French editors Lucas Stoll and Gaylor Morestin created a fan edit, simply titled Breaking Bad: The Movie, condensing the entire series into a two-hour feature film and uploaded it onto Vimeo. They had worked on the film for around two years prior to its release. However the film was soon taken down for copyright violation. Critic Alan Sepinwall remarked that the movie "doesn't in any way work as a standalone entity." In order to achieve feature film length, notable side characters like Tuco Salamanca and the Salamanca Cousins were cut entirely, and the conclusion to the Gustavo Fring story occurred off-screen.

Say My Name! (2019)

Say My Name is a 2019 parody musical with music, lyrics and book by Rob Gathercole based on AMC's Breaking Bad created by Vince Gilligan. The musical condenses the entire plot of Breaking Bad down to a one-act play that was under two hours with a heightened sense of camp and satire. A physical release of the cast recording was available for sale at the official Breaking Bad Store in Albuquerque, New Mexico.

References

External links
  – official site, Sony Pictures
 
 
  – official site, AMC
 
 

Breaking Bad
Sony Pictures franchises
Television franchises